Feodora of Leiningen (Anna Feodora Auguste Charlotte Wilhelmine; 7 December 1807 – 23 September 1872) was the only daughter of Emich Carl, Prince of Leiningen (1763–1814), and Princess Victoria of Saxe-Coburg-Saalfeld (1786–1861). Feodora and her older brother Carl, 3rd Prince of Leiningen, were maternal half-siblings to Queen Victoria of Great Britain. She is a matrilineal ancestress (through women only) of Carl XVI Gustaf of Sweden and of Felipe VI of Spain.

Life

Feodora was born in Amorbach, Bavaria, on 7 December 1807 to Princess Victoria of Saxe-Coburg-Saalfeld and her first husband, Emich Carl, Prince of Leiningen. She received her first two names from her maternal aunt, Grand Duchess Anna Feodorovna of Russia, who was born Princess Juliane of Saxe-Coburg-Saalfeld but received the name Anna Feodorovna following her conversion to Eastern Christianity, for her marriage to Grand Duke Konstantin Pavlovich of Russia in 1796. Feodora's father died in 1814.

On 29 May 1818, her mother remarried to Prince Edward Augustus, Duke of Kent and Strathearn, the fourth son of King George III. The following year, when the duchess's pregnancy was reaching full term, the household moved so that the new potential heir to the British throne could be born in Britain.

Feodora enjoyed a very close relationship with her younger half-sister Victoria, who was devoted to her, although Victoria resented the fact that Feodora was one of only a few other children with whom she was allowed regular interaction. Despite their closeness, Feodora was eager to leave their residence at Kensington Palace permanently, as her "only happy time was driving out" with Victoria and her governess Baroness Louise Lehzen, when she could "speak and look as she liked".

Marriage and later life 

In early 1828, Feodora married Ernst I, Prince of Hohenlohe-Langenburg (1794–1860), at Kensington Palace. The match was arranged by Queen Adelaide of Great Britain, as Prince Ernst I was her first cousin. Prior to that, she had only met him twice. After their honeymoon, she returned to the German Confederation, where she lived until her death in 1872. The prince had no domain, however, as the principality had been mediatised to Württemberg in 1806. The couple lived in a large and uncomfortable castle, Schloss Langenburg.

Feodora maintained a lifelong correspondence with her half-sister Victoria and was granted an allowance of £300 whenever she could visit Britain. She was a member of the royal party at Victoria's coronation in 1838.

Feodora's youngest daughter, the Duchess of Saxe-Meiningen, died in early 1872 of scarlet fever. Feodora died later that year. On hearing of Feodora's death, Victoria wrote:

Issue
Feodora and Ernest had six children (three sons and three daughters):
Carl Ludwig II, Prince of Hohenlohe-Langenburg (25 October 1829 – 16 May 1907), succeeded his father on 12 April 1860, but abdicated his rights on 21 April to marry unequally. He married Maria Grathwohl on 22 February 1861. They had three children. His male issue was created Prince of Weikersheim on 18 July 1911 by Emperor Franz Joseph.
Princess Elise of Hohenlohe-Langenburg (8 November 1830 – 27 February 1850) died at the age of 19. 
Hermann, Prince of Hohenlohe-Langenburg (31 August 1832 – 9 March 1913) married Princess Leopoldine of Baden on 24 September 1862. They had three children.
Prince Victor of Hohenlohe-Langenburg (11 December 1833 – 31 December 1891) married Lady Laura Seymour on 24 January 1861. They had four children.
Princess Adelheid of Hohenlohe-Langenburg (20 July 1835 – 25 January 1900) married Frederick VIII, Duke of Schleswig-Holstein-Sonderburg-Augustenburg on 11 September 1856. They had five children.
Princess Feodora of Hohenlohe-Langenburg (7 July 1839 – 10 February 1872) married George II, Duke of Saxe-Meiningen on 23 October 1858. They had three sons.

In media
In Victoria Series 3 (2019), Feodora is played by Kate Fleetwood. In the programme, Feodora is portrayed as a scheming, jealous sister who has fled Langenburg and refuses to return to her home, which is not historically accurate.

Ancestry

References

Notes

Bibliography

 
 

1807 births
1872 deaths
Leiningen family
Princesses of Leiningen
House of Hohenlohe-Langenburg
Princesses of Hohenlohe-Langenburg